Telmo Teixeira-Rebelo (born 18 February 1988) is a Portuguese-German footballer who plays as an attacking midfielder for 1. FC Magdeburg.

Career

Teixeira-Rebelo played youth and reserve football for three of Germany's biggest clubs (VfB Stuttgart, 1. FC Nürnberg and Eintracht Frankfurt), before joining HFC in 2010. In his second season, he helped the club earn promotion to the 3. Liga, and played in their first game at this level, a 1–0 win over Kickers Offenbach.
After falling out of grace in Halle following their promotion, he dissolved his contract and signed a contract until June 2014 with fierce rivals 1. FC Magdeburg on 17 January 2013.

References

External links

1988 births
Living people
German people of Portuguese descent
German footballers
1. FC Nürnberg II players
Eintracht Frankfurt II players
Hallescher FC players
1. FC Magdeburg players
3. Liga players
Association football midfielders
People from Reutlingen
Sportspeople from Tübingen (region)
Footballers from Baden-Württemberg